WAGX (101.3 FM) is a radio station  broadcasting a classic hits format. Licensed to Manchester, Ohio, United States, with studios in Maysville, Kentucky.  The station was founded by Maysville native and local county sheriff Garey A. Beckett and longtime friend James Wagoner. It is currently owned by Jewell Schaeffer Broadcasting Co. WAGX is licensed as a Class A FM station projecting 3,000 watts of effective radiated power.  Its antenna pattern is non-directional and it is located in Plumville, KY. Broadcast Veteran George W. Morgan III, is Account executive.

References

External links

AGX
Classic hits radio stations in the United States
Radio stations established in 1975